The discography of American rapper Lil Durk consists of eight studio albums (including one collaborative album), four compilation albums, one live album, one extended play, thirteen mixtapes, and 150 singles (including 82 as a featured artist).

On April 3, 2012, Durk released his debut commercial mixtape, I'm Still a Hitta, a sequel to his mixtape, I'm a Hitta. He released his second commercial mixtape, Life Ain’t No Joke on October 19, 2012.  Durk would release his fourth mixtapeSigned to the Streets, on October 10, 2013, with it serving as his first release after being signed to French Montana's Coke Boys imprint. Durk released his fifth commercial mixtape, Signed to the Streets 2, a sequel to his previous project, on July 7, 2014.
 
On June 2, 2015, Durk released his debut studio album, Remember My Name, which served as his first release for Def Jam Recordings. The album became his first project to chart on the Billboard 200, peaking at number 14 on the chart. He released his sixth commercial mixtape, 300 Days 300 Nights, on December 15, 2015.
 
Durk released his second studio album, Lil Durk 2X, on July 22, 2016. The album peaked at number 29 on the Billboard 200. He released his seventh commercial mixtape, They Forgot, on November 26, 2016. He released his eighth commercial mixtape, Love Songs 4 the Streets, on March 1, 2017. He released his debut extended play,  Supa Vultures with fellow rapper Lil Reese on August 11, 2017.  Durk would release his EP Signed to the Streets 2.5, a bridge in his Signed to the Streets series, on October 19, 2017, his 25th birthday. He released a collaborative mixtape with Tee Grizzley, Bloodas, on December 8, 2017, which peaked at number 96 on the Billboard 200. 
 
On March 30, 2018, Durk released his eighth commercial mixtape, Just Cause Y'all Waited. The mixtape peaked at number 57 on the Billboard 200.
 
Durk released his third studio album, Signed to the Streets 3, the last installment of his Signed to the Streets trilogy, on November 9, 2018. The album peaked at number 17 on the Billboard 200.
 
Durk released his fourth studio album, Love Songs 4 the Streets 2, a sequel to Love Songs 4 the Streets, on August 2, 2019. The album peaked at number two on the Billboard 200. Durk released a compilation album with Only the Family, Family over Everything, on December 11, 2019. The album peaked at number 93 on the Billboard Hot 100.
 
On May 8, 2020, Durk released his fifth studio album, Just Cause Y'all Waited 2, a sequel to Just Cause Y'all Waited. The album peaked at number two on the Billboard 200. 
 
Durk released his sixth studio album, The Voice, on December 23, 2020. The album also peaked at number two on the Billboard 200, tying with Just Cause Y'all Waited 2. From the deluxe edition of the album, it produced the top-40 song, "Finesse Out the Gang Way", which features Lil Baby and reached number 39 on the Billboard Hot 100. On June 4, 2021, Durk released a collaborative album with Lil Baby, The Voice of the Heroes, which is named after Durk's nickname of "the Voice" and Baby's nickname of "the Hero". The album debuted and peaked atop the Billboard 200, giving Durk his first chart-topping project. It produced the top-40 single, the album's title track, "Voice of the Heroes", which peaked at number 21 on the Hot 100. "Hats Off", a collaboration with Travis Scott, another song from the album, became a top-20 song, debuting and peaking at number 16 on the chart. The album also contains two top-40 songs, "2040" and "How It Feels", which debuted and peaked at numbers 31 and 34 on the Hot 100, respectively.
 
Durk released his seventh studio album, 7220, on March 11, 2022. The album debuted and peaked atop the Billboard 200, giving Durk his second chart-topping project and first solo chart-topping project. It produced two top-20 singles, "Broadway Girls" from 2021 and "Ahhh Ha", which reached numbers 14 and 19 on the Billboard Hot 100, respectively; the former single features Morgan Wallen and gave Durk his highest-charting single as a lead artist. It also produced the top-40 single, "Pissed Me Off" from 2021, which debuted and peaked at number 39 on the Hot 100.
 
Durk has also been featured on several songs that have received mainstream success. In 2020, he appeared on Drake's single, "Laugh Now Cry Later", which debuted and peaked at number two on the Billboard Hot 100, giving him his highest-charting song in total. That same year, Durk was featured on Pooh Shiesty's single, "Back in Blood", which reached number 13 on the Hot 100. In 2021, he joined Coi Leray on the remix of her single, "No More Parties", which hit number 26 on the Hot 100. That same year, Durk was featured alongside Lil Baby on DJ Khaled's single, "Every Chance I Get", which debuted and peaked at number 20 on the Hot 100. Durk also appeared alongside the Kid Laroi on Polo G's song, "No Return", which charted at number 26 on the Hot 100. Later in the year, Durk was once again featured alongside Lil Baby on Meek Mill's single, "Sharing Locations", which debuted and peaked at number 22 on the Hot 100. He also appeared alongside Vory on Kanye West's song, "Jonah", which reached number 27 on the Hot 100. Durk then appeared alongside Giveon on another Drake song, this time on "In the Bible", which debuted and peaked at number seven on the Hot 100. Continuing the year, he was featured alongside G Herbo and 21 Savage on another version of Nardo Wick's single, "Who Want Smoke?", titled "Who Want Smoke??" with an extra question mark in the title, which reached number 17 on the Hot 100.

Albums

Studio albums

Collaborative albums

Compilation albums

Live albums

Mixtapes

Singles

As lead artist

As featured artist

Promotional singles

Other charted and certified songs

Guest appearances

Notes

References

Discographies of American artists
Hip hop discographies